Alexandra Daum (born 1986) is a retired Austrian alpine skier.

She recorded a 13th place at the 2006 Junior World Championships and a 5th place at the 2007 Winter Universiade.

She made her World Cup debut in December 2008 in La Molina. She collected her first World Cup points with a 24th place in January 2009 in Garmisch-Partenkirchen, also improving to 11th in Ofterschwang before the end of the 2008–09 season. Exclusively a slalom racer, her career World Cup best was a 9th place from November 2012 in Levi. Her last World Cup outing was a 26th place in March 2015 in Åre.

She represented the sports club SV Aschau im Zillertal.

References 

1986 births
Living people
People from Schwaz District
Austrian female alpine skiers
Sportspeople from Tyrol (state)
20th-century Austrian women
21st-century Austrian women